The Chorley Borough Council elections took place on 1 May 2008. One third of the council was up for election.

Election result

Results map

Wards

Adlington and Anderton

Brindle and Hoghton ward

Chorley East ward

Chorley North East ward

Chorley North West ward

N.B. Percentage change in Chorley North-West is taken from when a Snape last faced the electorate.

Chorley South East ward

Chorley South West ward

Clayton-le-Woods and Whittle-le-Woods ward

Clayton-le-Woods North ward

Coppull ward

Eccleston and Mawdesley ward

Euxton North ward

Heath Charnock and Rivington ward

N.B. Percentage change in Lostock is taken from when Margaret Iddon last faced the electorate.

Wheelton and Withnell ward

References
2008 Chorley election result
Elections 2008 Results
Election candidates revealed
Labour man loses seat after 18 years

2008
2008 English local elections
2000s in Lancashire